Luncavița may refer to several places in Romania:

 Luncavița, Caraș-Severin, a commune in Caraș-Severin County
 Luncavița, Tulcea, a commune in Tulcea County
 Luncavița (Danube), a tributary of the Danube in Tulcea County
 Luncavița (Mehadica), a tributary of the Mehadica in Caraș-Severin County

See also 
 Lunca (disambiguation)
 Luncile (disambiguation)
 Luncani (disambiguation)
 Luncșoara (disambiguation)